Elizabeth Johnson may refer to:
Elizabeth Johnson Jr. (1671–?), convicted during the Salem witch trials
Elizabeth Johnson (died 1752) (1689–1752), wife of writer Samuel Johnson
Elizabeth Johnson (actress)  (1771–1830), English stage actress
Elizabeth Johnson (pamphleteer) (1721–1800), longitude projector
Eliza McCardle Johnson (1810–1876), wife of US president Andrew Johnson
Elizabeth A. Johnson (fl. 1870–1901), advocate of Kansas history
Elizabeth Johnson (theologian) (born 1941), Christian feminist theologian
Elizabeth Friench Johnson,American college professor
E. Elizabeth Johnson, Presbyterian biblical scholar
Betty Johnson (born 1931), American traditional pop and cabaret singer
Betsey Johnson (born 1942), American fashion designer
Betty Johnson (physicist) (1936–2003), American theoretical physicist
Betsy Johnson (born 1951), American politician in Oregon
Liz Johnson (bowler) (born 1974), American professional bowler
Liz Johnson (swimmer) (born 1985), British Paralympic gold medalist
Elizabeth Johnson, character from American Horror Story: Hotel

See also
Elizabeth Johnston (disambiguation)